Mary Weiss (born December 28, 1948) is an American pop music vocalist, best known as the lead singer of the Shangri-Las in the 1960s. She then vanished from the music scene for decades, returning in 2007 to record her first solo album with Norton Records.

Background
Growing up in Queens, Weiss, her older sister Elizabeth (known as Betty) and her older brother George lived in Cambria Heights. She sang in school plays and church choirs. Additionally, she listened to her brother and his friends perform popular songs of the day; George being an Elvis fan. Mary appreciated such performers as Neil Sedaka and the Everly Brothers; she attended her first Everly Brothers concert in 1963 at Freedomland U.S.A. at the age of 14.

Early recordings 
After Weiss and her sister Betty became good friends with twins Mary Ann and Margie Ganser in grammar school, the four of them sang at local dances and hops. That brought them to the attention of local producer Artie Ripp, who later signed them on to Kama Sutra Productions. After recording demos and making it to the Brill Building in 1964 (and signing with Red Bird Records), they recorded songs: "Remember (Walking in the Sand)", which was their first hit, and "Leader of the Pack", which went to #1 on the Billboard Hot 100 charts in 1964.

With their growing popularity, the Shangri-Las became a leading girl group in the 1960s. After several years of the grind, they split in 1968 and went their separate ways. Weiss went to San Francisco to try a different lifestyle. She later came back to New York and occasionally gave shows with the Shangri-Las during the 1970s which led to a comeback attempt with Sire Records in 1977. In 1989, the Shangri-Las reunited one last time for Cousin Brucie's Palisades Park Reunion show at The Meadowlands in New Jersey.

New career 
Weiss took a job as purchasing agent in New York City in Manhattan; as she recalled, "I went to work for an architectural firm, and I was seriously into it. Then I got into commercial interiors, huge projects, buildings." She later moved up to be the chief purchasing agent and ran the commercial furniture dealership. In the late 1980s, she managed a furniture store and was an interior designer. By 2001, she was a furniture consultant to New York businesses.

Rock and Roll Hall of Fame
In 2019, the Rock & Roll Hall of Fame honored the Shangri-Las' "Leader of the Pack", on which Weiss sang lead, with the Hall's Singles category.

Going solo 
In 2005, Weiss left her job in commercial interiors to get back to music. In March 2007, Norton Records released Dangerous Game, a critically acclaimed solo album, on which she was backed by The Reigning Sound. She has been performing elsewhere in the United States, and in Spain and France.

References

External links 
 Mary Weiss official site
 Mary Weiss Biography by Mark Deming

1948 births
Living people
American businesspeople in retailing
American child singers
American consulting businesspeople
American women singers
American women interior designers
Businesspeople from New York City
Child pop musicians
Norton Records artists
People from Cambria Heights, Queens
Singers from New York City